Johanne McKay (born May 21, 1974) is a Canadian actress. She is most noted for her performance in the film My Friend Max (Mon amie Max), for which she was a Genie Award nominee for Best Supporting Actress at the 15th Genie Awards in 1994.

References

External links

1974 births
Living people
20th-century Canadian actresses
21st-century Canadian actresses
Canadian film actresses
Canadian television actresses
Actresses from Quebec
French Quebecers